The Chasseur class consisted of four destroyers built for the French Navy during the first decade of the twentieth century. They saw service during the First World War. One ship was sunk during the war and the survivors were scrapped afterwards. A fifth ship was sold to Peru.

Design and description
The Chasseur class was based on the earlier , albeit with oil-fired boilers. Designed to displaced , the ships displaced  at deep load. Their crews numbered 77–179 men.

The destroyers were powered by three Parsons direct-drive steam turbines, each driving one propeller shafts using steam provided by four water-tube boilers of two different types.

The primary armament of the Chasseur-class ships consisted of six  Modèle 1902 guns in single mounts, one each fore and aft of the superstructure and the others were distributed amidships. They were also fitted with three  torpedo tubes. One of these was in a fixed mount in the bow and the other two were on single rotating mounts amidships.

Ships

References

Bibliography

 
 
 

Destroyer classes
Destroyers of the French Navy
 
Destroyers of the Peruvian Navy
 
Ship classes of the French Navy